Pauls Kaņeps (14 November 1911 – 9 November 2006) was a Latvian cross-country skier. He competed in the men's 18 kilometre event at the 1936 Winter Olympics.

References

1911 births
2006 deaths
Latvian male cross-country skiers
Olympic cross-country skiers of Latvia
Cross-country skiers at the 1936 Winter Olympics
Place of birth missing